Bhuttar (also spelt Bhutter and Buttar) is a village in the Sialkot District of Punjab, Pakistan.

References 

Villages in Sialkot District